Glena grisearia is a species of geometrid moth in the family Geometridae. It is found in North America.

The MONA or Hodges number for Glena grisearia is 6445.

References

Further reading

 
 

Boarmiini
Articles created by Qbugbot
Moths described in 1883